Hyle was a town in Ozolian Locris in ancient Greece, from which the river Hylaethus perhaps derived its name. 

Its site is unlocated.

References

Populated places in Ozolian Locris
Former populated places in Greece
Lost ancient cities and towns